Orthodox Church may refer to:

 Eastern Orthodox Church
 Oriental Orthodox Churches
 Orthodox Presbyterian Church
 Orthodox Presbyterian Church of New Zealand
 State church of the Roman Empire
 True Orthodox church

See also 
 Orthodox (disambiguation)
 Orthodox calendar (disambiguation)
 Orthodox Communion (disambiguation)
 Orthodoxy by country (disambiguation)
 Orthodox Catholic Church (disambiguation)
 Catholic Church (disambiguation)
 Neo-orthodoxy